Thaha hussain career counsellor and social worker ( September 16 - 1997 ) in kerala 

He is starting education in ganapath boys chalapuram then higher secondary JDT ISLAM CALICUT 

He started social work in the time he is focusing minority peoples problems , and is education, marriage etc.. or origination of any new thing (a product, solution, artwork, literary work, etc.) that has value.

Creativity may also refer to:
thaha hussain (career counseling)
Creativity (process philosophy)
Creativity (religion), a white-separatist organization
 Creativity Alliance
 Creativity Movement
Creativity, Action, Service, an educational programme
Creativity techniques
Creative Technology, a computer products manufacturer